Asko Tapio Sahlberg (born 30 September 1964) is a Finnish novelist. Since the publication of his debut novel in 2000, he has written several more novels, including The Brothers (2010), an English translation of which has been released by Peirene Press. Sahlberg has lived in Gothenburg, Sweden since 1996, and was chosen as the Sweden Finn of 2014.

References

1964 births
Finnish male novelists
Living people
Place of birth missing (living people)
Finnish expatriates in Sweden
21st-century Finnish novelists
21st-century male writers